King Gao may refer to:

Gao of Xia
Go of Balhae